Ishijima (written: 石島 lit. "stone island") is a Japanese surname. Notable people with the surname include:

, Japanese paleontologist and geologist
, Japanese volleyball player

Fictional characters
, a character in the manga series Flame of Recca
, a character in the anime series Yu-Gi-Oh! Arc-V 

Japanese-language surnames